Mohammad Reza Navaei (1 December 1948 – 3 August 2020) was an Iranian lightweight freestyle wrestler. He won bronze medals at the 1973 World Wrestling Championships and 1974 Asian Games, and competed at the 1976 Summer Olympics.

Coaching career 

Reza Navaei was the coach of Iran's wrestling team at the 1988 Summer Olympics and an  assistant coach at 1992 Summer Olympics, 1990 World Wrestling Championships, 1991, 1993, and 1994. He was also the coach of Indonesia's team at the 1978 World Wrestling Championships.

References

1948 births
2020 deaths
World Wrestling Championships medalists
Olympic wrestlers of Iran
Wrestlers at the 1976 Summer Olympics
Asian Games bronze medalists for Iran
Asian Games medalists in wrestling
Wrestlers at the 1974 Asian Games
Medalists at the 1974 Asian Games
Iranian male sport wrestlers
20th-century Iranian people
21st-century Iranian people